The St. Louis County Depot is a historic train station in Duluth, Minnesota, United States. It was built as a union station in 1892, serving seven railroads at its peak.  Rail service ceased in 1969 and the building was threatened with demolition until it reopened in 1973 as St. Louis County Heritage & Arts Center (The Depot). Train service also resumed from 1974 to 1985, by Amtrak.

The Depot is owned by St. Louis County. 

Mission: The St. Louis County Depot is a landmark cornerstone of arts and cultural organizations that entertains, educates, inspires, and provides space for a diverse group of guests. The St. Louis County Depot provides new, engaging experiences; is a destination and a community center; and fosters community through education and entertainment that enhances the quality of life for visitors.

Vision Statement: To provide welcoming space and foster connections for distinctive educational and cultural activity. 

Today, the building houses three exhibiting museums (the Duluth Art Institute, Lake Superior Railroad Museum, and St. Louis County Historical Society Museum), two performing arts organizations (Duluth Playhouse and Minnesota Ballet), and serves as the departure point for the North Shore Scenic Railroad.

Description
The Depot is located at 506 West Michigan Avenue right off of I-35, which runs immediately southeast of the Depot.  The historic building houses several contemporary and historic artworks and artifacts, as well as an experimental theater, and also hosts public events in its Great Hall. The 1977 addition, houses a large theater and a ballet studio. The lower station has one side platform and three island platforms that provide access to its seven tracks. The outer southeast active track is used by a scenic railroad, with the remainder being used to display various trains and train cars.

History
The Depot was designed by architectural firm Peabody and Stearns. (It was built next to an 1870 wood-framed depot building, which was disassembled after its replacement was complete.) Many local materials were used in the French Norman-style building, including granite, sandstone, and yellow brick. After two years of construction, the Depot was completed in 1892 at a cost of $615,000. A large train shed originally covered the building's platforms, but it was removed in 1924 and replaced by the canopies that remain. Over the next 77 years, it served seven railroads: Duluth & Iron Range, Duluth, Missabe, & Iron Range, Duluth, South Shore & Atlantic, Duluth Missabe & Northern, Great Northern Railway, Northern Pacific, and the Saint Paul & Duluth. 

The main entrance to the building on Michigan Street opened into a "general waiting room" (today known as the Great Hall) which featured a news stand and a lunch counter. In addition the main floor also boasted a barber shop, a Western Union telegraph office, a smoking room, a ladies waiting room, and a men's toilet. 

Its last trains in the years leading up to the establishment of Amtrak were run by the Great Northern Railway and later absorbed into the Burlington Northern Railroad (Badger and Gopher, both to Minneapolis and St. Paul). The Northern Pacific Railway ran local unnamed service to St. Paul and Minneapolis and service to Staples, Minnesota into the latter 1960s.

It closed in 1969, and was scheduled for demolition but was purchased from the railroad owner for the bargain price of $250,000 and saved. The edifice was in excellent condition, but renovations still cost $4.7 million.

The building was listed on the National Register of Historic Places as the Duluth Union Depot in 1971 for its state-level significance in the themes of architecture and transportation.  It was nominated as a unique example of the era's large railroad terminals and the connection they provided to the rest of the nation.

This building is actually the second depot built on this site. The first was built in 1869 and was a small wooden building. That same year a large group of Swedish immigrants arrived in Duluth. They traveled here for a chance to work on the construction of the first railroad line in Duluth, the Lake Superior and Mississippi.

Former Amtrak service
While The Depot continued to house its other tenants, Amtrak provided rail service to the station for nearly a decade (1977–1985). In 1975 Amtrak initiated the Arrowhead to provide service from the Great Northern Depot in Minneapolis to Superior, Wisconsin (which is south of Duluth, just across the Saint Louis Bay of Lake Superior). In 1978 the North Star replaced the Arrowhead and extended the rail service south from Minneapolis–Saint Paul to Chicago, Illinois. The next stop for both Amtrak trains was in Superior, Wisconsin. In 1981 service by the North Star was truncated back to the Midway Station in Saint Paul. However, in 1985 Amtrak ended all passenger rail service to Duluth when the North Star was entirely discontinued.

Current Day

North Shore Scenic Railroad
Scenic tours from the station continue to be provided by the North Shore Scenic Railroad (a heritage railroad operated by the Lake Superior Railroad Museum), which provides several different excursions from Duluth to points northeast along Lake Superior's northern shore. Regular tours are round-trip, ranging from one to six hours long, with destinations including the Lester River, the area of Palmers, and the city of Two Harbors. The railroad also provides a variety of special excursions throughout the year, as well as opportunities for charter trips.

St. Louis County Historical Society
The SLCHS has exhibits housed in The Depot. These exhibits include Veterans Memorial Hall and are free for the public to enjoy. Since its inception in 1922, the St. Louis County Historical Society has sought to discover,  preserve, and disseminate knowledge about the history, and prehistory, of St. Louis County as well as the state of Minnesota.

Duluth Art Institute
The Duluth Art Institute exhibits work in its own George Morrison Gallery, John Steffl Gallery and Corridor Gallery located in the St. Louis County Depot, as well as the Depot's Great Hall & Performing Arts Wing.

Minnesota Ballet
The Minnesota Ballet’s mission is to inspire appreciation of the art of dance through performance and education. The ballet has 3 rehearsal spaces in The Depot along with occasional events and performances in the building.

The Depot Foundation
The Depot Foundation is dedicated to preserving The Depot as a vibrant and welcoming forum for the arts, culture and history through managing and growing a permanent endowment.

Proposed rail service
Renovations to the depot are in planning to serve the Northern Lights Express Higher-speed rail service from Minneapolis to Duluth. This  project will roughly follow the route of Amtrak's former North Star and is expected to include stops in Coon Rapids, Isanti, Cambridge, and Hinckley in Minnesota and in Superior, Wisconsin.

See also
 National Register of Historic Places listings in St. Louis County, Minnesota

References

External links

Duluth Art Institute
Lake Superior Railroad Museum
North Shore Scenic Railroad
St. Louis County Historical Society

1892 establishments in Minnesota
Art museums and galleries in Minnesota
Châteauesque architecture in the United States
Duluth, Minnesota
Former Amtrak stations in Minnesota
History museums in Minnesota
Museums established in 1973
Museums in Duluth, Minnesota
National Register of Historic Places in St. Louis County, Minnesota
Peabody and Stearns buildings
Railroad museums in Minnesota
Railway stations on the National Register of Historic Places in Minnesota
Railway stations in the United States opened in 1892
Railway stations closed in 1985
Transportation in Duluth, Minnesota
Theatres in Minnesota
Former Great Northern Railway (U.S.) stations